AG København (former name: AG Håndbold) was a Danish handball club from Glostrup and Albertslund, two suburbs of Copenhagen, Denmark. In the season 2010/2011 it plays in the Danish Handball League. Their head coach was former Danish national team player Klavs Bruun Jørgensen in the 2010/11 season. Head coach is former Swedish national team player Magnus Andersson. On 28 April 2012, they qualified for the Final4-event in Cologne in EHF Champions League after beating FC Barcelona. The club filed for bankruptcy on July 31, 2012, after Jesper Nielsen pulled out of the club.

Accomplishments

Danish Handball League : 2
Winners : 2010–11,  2011–12
National Cup of Denmark : 2
Winners : 2009–10,  2010–11
EHF Champions League : 
3rd place : 2011–12

Final squad 

Goalkeeper

  Kasper Hvidt
  Steinar Ege

Right wing

  Kasper Ottesen
  Niclas Ekberg

Left wing

  Guðjón Valur Sigurðsson
  Stefan Hundstrup

Right back

  Lars T. Jørgensen
   Olafur Stefansson
  Cristian Malmagro

Left back

  Mikkel Hansen
  Arnór Atlason
  Mads Mensah Larsen

Middle back

  Snorri Guðjónsson
  Joachim Boldsen

Line player
  Rene Toft Hansen
  Henrik Toft Hansen

Leaving 2010/11 
 Mads Mensah Larsen (Nordsjælland Håndbold) (Loan)
 Peter Nørklit (Nordsjælland Håndbold)
 Matias Helt Jepsen (FHK Elite)

Additions 2010/11 
 Mikkel Hansen (FC Barcelona)
 Joachim Boldsen (FC Barcelona)
 Kasper Hvidt (FCK Håndbold)
 Steinar Ege (FCK Håndbold)
 Jacob Bagersted (FCK Håndbold)
 Arnór Atlason (FCK Håndbold)
 Snorri Guðjónsson (Rhein-Neckar Löwen)
 Cristian Malmagro (Portland San Antonio)
 Niclas Ekberg (Ystads IF HF)
 Rene Toft Hansen (KIF Kolding)
 Stefan Hundstrup (Viborg HK)
 Thomas Bruhn (Rhein-Neckar Löwen)

Leaving 2011/12 
 Jacob Bagersted (Aalborg Håndbold)
 Jakob Green Jensen (Team TVIS Holstebro)
 Thomas Bruhn (Mors-Thy Håndbold)
 Mikkel Saad (Århus Håndbold)
 Martin Bager

Additions 2011/12 
 Henrik Toft Hansen (AaB Håndbold)
 Olafur Stefansson (Rhein-Neckar Löwen)
 Gudjon Valur Sigurdsson (Rhein-Neckar Löwen)
 Olafur Gudmundsson (Fimleikafélag Hafnarfjarðar)
 Mads Mensah Larsen (Nordsjælland Håndbold) (return from loan)

Leaving 2012/13 
 Rene Toft Hansen (THW Kiel)
 Guðjón Valur Sigurðsson (THW Kiel)
 Cristian Malmagro (Montpellier Agglomération Handball)

Additions 2012/13 
  Fredrik Petersen (Bjerringbro-Silkeborg)
  Kim Andersson (THW Kiel)
  Carlos Prieto (Bergischer HC)

References

External links 
 The club's homepage 
  

Danish handball clubs
Defunct sports clubs in Copenhagen